News at 12:30 is the afternoon news programme broadcast Monday to Sunday at 12:30pm in Hong Kong by television channel ATV Home.

History
Starting at May 29, 1957, with broadcasting time from Monday to Sunday at 12:00pm.
On September 24, 1982 renamed ATV moved to Monday to Sunday at 1:00pm.
On May 11, 1987 moved back to the Monday to Sunday at 12:45pm.
On February 13, 1989 renamed News at 12:45.
On October 17, 1994 moved back to the 12:30pm.
On Monday July 27, 2009 the programming switched to background.

Hong Kong television shows